Varshney (वार्ष्णेय) is an Indian family name. Alternative names for the group include Barahseni and Bara-Saini. They were traditionally traders and substantial landowners.

Notable people with this name include:
 Ashutosh Varshney, American political scientist
 Rajeev Kumar Varshney, Director, Centre of Excellence in Genomics at ICRISAT
 Ishwar Das Varshnei (died 1948), called "father of the glass industry" in India
 Y. P. Varshni (born 1932), physicist
 Umesh Varshney (born 1957),  molecular biologist
Alka Nupur Varshney, Kathak dancer and former actress

Fictional characters 
 Anil Varshney in the 2012 novel The Krishna Key
 Rahul Varshney and Kala Varshney in the 2014 film Ugly

References 

Indian surnames
Social groups of Uttar Pradesh